Mhlontlo Local Municipality is an administrative area in the OR Tambo District of Eastern Cape in South Africa.

Mhlontlo was a chief of the Pondomise people during the 19th century.

Main places
The 2001 census divided the municipality into the following main places:

Politics 

The municipal council consists of fifty-one members elected by mixed-member proportional representation. Twenty-six councillors are elected by first-past-the-post voting in twenty-six wards, while the remaining twenty-five are chosen from party lists so that the total number of party representatives is proportional to the number of votes received. In the election of 1 November 2021 the African National Congress (ANC) won a majority of forty seats on the council.
The following table shows the results of the election.

References

External links
 Official Website

Local municipalities of the OR Tambo District Municipality